Gabriel Jhon Cortez Casierra (born 10 October 1995) is an Ecuadorian footballer who plays as a midfielder for Liga PRO Ecuador club Barcelona S.C.. Previously Cortez played for Independiente del Valle, Lobos BUAP, Emelec, Botafogo and made his international debut on 22 February 2017 against Honduras.

Career

Independiente Del Valle
In the 2017 Copa Libertadores group stage Cortez scored a last minute equalizer against Deportivo Municipal to keep his team in the competition.

Jail
On April 24,2022 Gabriel "Loco'' Cortez was arrested for potential ties with cartel. In June 2022 he was released on bail.

Career statistics

References

1995 births
Living people
Ecuadorian footballers
Ecuador international footballers
Ecuadorian Serie A players
Liga MX players
Campeonato Brasileiro Série A players
C.S.D. Independiente del Valle footballers
Lobos BUAP footballers
Botafogo de Futebol e Regatas players
C.S. Emelec footballers
Guayaquil City F.C. footballers
Barcelona S.C. footballers
People from Esmeraldas Province
Ecuadorian expatriate footballers
Ecuadorian expatriate sportspeople in Mexico
Ecuadorian expatriate sportspeople in Brazil
Expatriate footballers in Mexico
Expatriate footballers in Brazil
Association football midfielders